The World University Boxing Championships are the official international collegiate competition in the sport of amateur boxing. Competitors are students of higher educational facilities worldwide (colleges, universities, institutes, etc.)

Editions

References

 
boxing
Amateur boxing
University